J. Edward Connor (19 April 1884 – 19 January 1955) was an English professional footballer who played as an outside forward in the Football League for Lincoln City, Manchester United, Sheffield United, Bury and Chesterfield. After his retirement from football, Connor returned to Manchester United as a scout and office worker.

Personal life 
Connor worked as a warehouseman. He served in the Royal Naval Air Service, the Royal Navy and the Royal Air Force during the First World War.

Career statistics

References

External links
Profile at StretfordEnd.co.uk
Profile at MUFCinfo.com

1884 births
1955 deaths
English footballers
Manchester United F.C. players
Sheffield United F.C. players
Bury F.C. players
Exeter City F.C. players
Rochdale A.F.C. players
Chesterfield F.C. players
Manchester United F.C. non-playing staff
Footballers from Liverpool
Eccles United F.C. players
Association football outside forwards
Association football inside forwards
English Football League players
Lincoln City F.C. players
Fulham F.C. players
Nelson F.C. players
Royal Naval Air Service personnel of World War I
Royal Air Force personnel of World War I
Royal Navy personnel of World War I